Juan de Triana (fl. 1460 – 1490, died 28 January 1494) was a Spanish composer of the Renaissance period, active in the second half of the 15th century during the reign of the Catholic Monarchs. Pope Sixtus IV issued a bull on 9 February 1478 that listed De Triana as Prebendary of the Cathedral of Sevilla for at least a year before. He later moved to the Cathedral of Toledo, where it was recorded that in 1483 he was a teacher of six children in the Cathedral, with a salary of 18,000 maravedíes, a significant quantity at the time. Possibly Triana held this position until 1490, when he was replaced by Pedro de Lagarto. He died in Seville on 28 January 1494, and was buried near the gate of the chapel of the Virgen de la Antigua. In his will, he left a bequest to endow a chaplaincy to sing twenty-five masses a month for his soul at the altar of San Juan Bautista, near his place of burial.

Works
Twenty works by Triana have been preserved, all in the Cancionero de la Colombina. Four of the works are religious and the remaining are secular. Three of them also have replicas in the Cancionero de Palacio. One of the religious pieces is a fragment of the Song of the Sibyl in Castilian, and the others are liturgical texts in Latin. The compositions have features that are common to the Iberian musicians of the generation before.

These works are found in the following sources:
 CMP - Madrid, Biblioteca Real, MS II - 1335 (Cancionero de Palacio) (E-Mp II-1335)
 CMC - Sevilla, Catedral Metropolitana, Biblioteca Capitular y Colombina, Ms. 7-I-28 (E-S 7-I-28)

Discography
?? - [AER] El Cancionero Musical de la Colombina, Renaissance Quartet. Main Instrument Panel Renaissance. MEC 1011 CD
1969 - [SFM] Musica Iberica I, Música Ibérica I until the fifteenth century - Monodia XII / XII, XIII century Polifonia, Villancicos XV century (John Urreda, Juan Cornago). früher der Musik Studio . EMI / Odeon J 063-20114 (LP).
1977 - [BER] Canciones Españolas, Teresa Berganza, Narciso Yepes, Felix Lavilla. Deutsche Grammophon 435 648-2.
1990 - [TRI] Juan de Triana: La Musica en la Era del Descubrimiento III, Ziryab Workshop. CAL-5019 Dial Records.
1991 - [HMC] Cornago: Missa de la mapa mundi, The Newberry Consort. Harmonia Mundi USA 907083.
1992 - [COL] El Cancionero de la Colombina, 1451-1506, Music at the time of Christopher Columbus, Hesperion XX. Jordi Savall. Astrée (Naïve) ES 9954.
1996 - [SIB] El Canto de la Sibila II, Galicia - Castilla. La Capella Reial de Catalunya. Jordi Savall, Montserrat Figueras . Astrée "Naïve" (Auvidis) ES 9942.
1999 - [UMB] Chaconne: Renaissance Spain in the Age of Empire, Ex Umbris. Dorian 93207.
2002 - [MAG] Iudicii Signum, Ministrers Capella . Carles Magraner. Licanus "Capella de Ministrers" CDM 0203.
2004 - [ISA] Isabel I, Reina de Castilla, Lights and Shadows in the time of the first great Renaissance Queen 1451-1504. La Capella Reial de Catalunya and Hespèrion XXI. Jordi Savall . Alia Vox AV 9838.

References

Year of birth unknown
Year of death unknown
Spanish classical composers
Spanish male classical composers
Renaissance composers
Spanish music educators